Plantago rigida, colloquially known as "Colchón de agua" (water mattress), is a species of flowering plant in the plantain family found in the high-altitude páramo biome of South America.

Distribution
Bolivia, Colombia, Ecuador, Peru, Venezuela.

References

rigida
Flora of South America